Daphnia coronata is a species of crustaceans in the family Daphniidae. It is endemic to South Africa.

References

Cladocera
Endemic crustaceans of South Africa
Crustaceans described in 1916
Taxonomy articles created by Polbot